The 104th Engineer Battalion "Torre" is an inactive military engineer unit of the Italian Army last based in Udine in Friuli. In 1944 the Italian Co-Belligerent Army formed the CIV Mixed Engineer Battalion for the Combat Group "Mantova", which fought on the allied side in the Italian campaign of World War II. In 1946 the battalion split to form the Engineer Battalion "Mantova" and the Connections Battalion "Mantova", which were both assigned to the Infantry Division "Mantova". In 1975 the battalion was named for the Torre river and assigned the flag and traditions of the 7th Engineer Regiment, which had been active between 1926 and 1943. In 1986 the Mechanized Division "Mantova" was disbanded and shortly thereafter so was the battalion.

History

World War II

7th Engineer Regiment 
On 1 October 1922 the 6th Army Corps Engineer Grouping was formed in Florence, which received the Sappers Battalion and the Telegraphers Battalion of the VIII Army Corps, and a miners company from the disbanded Miners Engineer Regiment. The grouping consisted of a command, a sappers-miners battalion, a telegraphers battalion, a photo-electricians company, four dovecotes (in Florence, La Spezia, Piacenza, and Nava), and a depot. In April 1923 a sappers-miners company moved to Ozieri in Sardinia and establish a detachment, which in May 1923 was transferred to the 7th Army Corps Engineer Grouping. In June 1923 the 6th Army Corps Engineer Grouping also transferred one of its telegraphers company to the detachment in Ozieri. On 1 December 1926 the grouping was renamed 7th Engineer Regiment. In February 1928 the regiment helped raise the 11th Engineer Regiment. On 28 October 1932 the regiment received the I Battalion of the disbanded 1st Radio-Telegraphers Regiment.

For the Second Italo-Ethiopian War the regiment mobilized the IX Sappers Battalion, XXX Sappers Battalion, I Connections Battalion, I Mixed Engineer Battalion and various smaller units. At the end of 1936 the regiment consisted of a command, an engineer battalion, a telegraphers battalion, a radio-telegraphers battalion, five dovecotes, and a depot. In January 1937 the telegraphers and radio-telegraphers battalions were renamed connections battalions.

With the outbreak of World War II the regiment's depot began to mobilize new units:

 XXXI Mixed Engineer Battalion (for the 131st Armored Division "Centauro")
 LXXX Mixed Engineer Battalion (for the 2nd Infantry Division "Sforzesca")
 CLI Mixed Engineer Battalion (for the 151st Infantry Division "Perugia")
 CCIV Mixed Engineer Battalion (for the 4th CC.NN. Division "3 Gennaio")
 XVIII Army Corps Engineer Battalion (for the XII Army Corps)
 XXXI Sappers Battalion
 II Marconists Battalion
 and many smaller units

The regiment was disbanded by invading German forces after the announcement of the Armistice of Cassibile on 8 September 1943.

Engineer Battalion "Mantova" 
On 1 October 1944 the CIV Mixed Engineer Battalion was formed in Cosenza for the Italian Co-Belligerent Army's Combat Group "Mantova". The battalion consisted of a command, the 79th Engineer Company and the 107th Teleradio Company. The battalion fought with the Combat Group "Mantova" on the allied side in the Italian campaign. On 1 January 1945 the 4th Engineer Company joined the battalion.

Cold War 
After World War II the Engineer Battalion "Mantova" was split on 6 September 1946 to form the Connections Battalion "Mantova" and the Engineer Battalion "Mantova", which were both assigned to the Infantry Division "Mantova". In 1947 the battalion moved to Udine. The same year the battalion added a third engineer company and a field park company.

During the 1975 army reform the army disbanded the regimental level and newly independent battalions were granted for the first time their own flags. During the reform engineer battalions were named for a lake if they supported a corps or named for a river if they supported a division or brigade. On 1 November 1975 the Engineer Battalion "Mantova" was renamed 104th Engineer Battalion "Torre" and assigned the flag and traditions of the 7th Engineer Regiment. The battalion also received all the traditions of the engineer units that served with the Mantova division. The battalion consisted of a command, a command and park company, and two engineer companies and was assigned to the Mechanized Division "Mantova".

For its conduct and work after the 1976 Friuli earthquake the battalion was awarded a Bronze Medal of Army Valour, which was affixed to the battalion's flag. Due to the damage the battalion's base in Udine had suffered in the earthquake the battalion moved to Orzano di Remanzacco.

In 1986 the Italian Army disbanded the divisional level and placed brigades under direct command of its Army Corps. On 1 October 1986 the command of the Mechanized Division "Mantova" was disbanded. On 31 October 1986 the 104th Engineer Battalion "Torre" was disbanded and the flag of the 7th Engineer Regiment was transferred on 6 November 1986 to the Shrine of the Flags in the Vittoriano in Rome.

References

Engineer Regiments of Italy